"Magic Stick"  is a song performed by American hip hop recording artist Lil' Kim, released on April 8, 2003, as the second single from her third studio album La Bella Mafia (2003). The song features fellow American rapper 50 Cent and was produced by Carlos "Fantom of the Beat" Evans. Despite not having a physical release or music video, the song performed  very well on the charts, peaking at number 2 on the Billboard Hot 100.

Background
The song samples "It Be's That Way Sometimes" by Joe Simon. The song was originally intended for 50 Cent's album Get Rich or Die Tryin' and featured rapper Trina. After Trina sent her verse back to 50 Cent, he decided that she wasn't suited well for the song. 50 Cent then sent the song to Lil' Kim. Lil' Kim failed to send the song back to 50 Cent in time to make the deadline for his record, so he let her use it for La Bella Mafia. A sequel to "Magic Stick", titled "Wanna Lick (Magic Stick, Pt. 2)", was recorded by the pair and released on Lil' Kim's 2008 mixtape Ms. G.O.A.T.

The song is featured in the films King's Ransom and Now You See Me 2 and the animated series The Cleveland Show episode Brown Magic.

Chart performance
The song debuted on the Billboard Hot 100 on April 26, 2003 at number 75 peaking at number two. A video was scheduled to be shot, but problems between Lil' Kim and 50 Cent caused the shoot to be canceled. The song received massive radio airplay, peaking at number one on the airplay chart, and it spent a total of 24 weeks on the Hot 100. It became Kim's second-highest-charting single as a lead artist and her second highest overall, after "Lady Marmalade". It also became 50 Cent's second overall top-10 and top-three single.

Live performance
Lil' Kim performed the song in 2011 at the latter's show in Australia.

Charts

Weekly charts

Year-end charts

Certifications

References 

2003 singles
Lil' Kim songs
50 Cent songs
Songs written by 50 Cent
Dirty rap songs
Songs written by Lil' Kim
2002 songs
Atlantic Records singles
Aftermath Entertainment singles
Shady Records singles